No Soul No Strain is the fifth album by the American band Wire Train, released in 1992.

The first single was "Stone Me". The band supported the album by touring with Live, among others.

Production
The album was produced by Bill Bottrell. Wire Train started work on the tracks in a cabin close to Yosemite National Park, and finished them in a Los Angeles studio.

Critical reception

The Chicago Tribune wrote: "Wire Train sounds too much like too many other modern rock outfits to be cited for iconoclastic genius and originality, but the California quartet does an exceptional job of delivering a variety of immediately accessible, funky pop hooks with a minimum of dull filler." Miami New Times deemed the album "delightfully casual and smartly cool real rock."

The State praised the "chunkier guitars and complex rhythms," writing that "this is Wire Train's most ambitious work to date." The Capital Times opined that "the wittiness of the lyrics ('Jesus and Mohammed were just a couple of regular guys who made a lot of good friends after they died') is supported by consistently compelling music."

Track listing 
All songs written by Wire Train. 
 Stone Me - 3:50
 Open Sky - 4:02
 Yeah, Yeah, Yeah - 5:33
 Crashing Back to You - 4:52
 Hey Jordan - 	4:41
 Other Lover - 2:56
 How Many More Times - 3:35
 Willing It to Be - 3:41
 Higher - 3:25
 Impossible - 2:36
 When I Met You - 3:26
 17 Spooks - 4:56

References

Wire Train albums
1992 albums
415 Records albums
Albums produced by Bill Bottrell